Jalan Belimbing-Pahang Tua (Pahang state route C106) is a major road in Pahang, Malaysia.

List of junctions

Roads in Pahang